Allopontonia is a genus of shrimp in the family Palaemonidae, containing two species:
Allopontonia alastairi Bruce, 2010
Allopontonia brockii (de Man, 1888)

References

External links
Allopontonia: images & occurrence data from GBIF.

Palaemonoidea
Taxa named by Alexander James Bruce
Crustaceans described in 1972